Kantunilkín is the municipal seat and largest city in Lázaro Cárdenas in the Mexican state of Quintana Roo. According to the 2010 census, the city's population was 7,150 persons.

Kantunilkín was established in 1850 by Mayan Cruzobs during the Caste War of Yucatán, and originally called Nueva Santa Cruz–Kantunil. In 1859, the inhabitants accepted the general amnesty and the place was granted recognition by the Mexican government.

References

External links
 

Populated places in Quintana Roo